Epimeniidae is a family of solenogaster, a shell-less worm-like mollusk.

Genera
 Epiherpia Salvini-Plawen, 1997
 Epimenia Nierstrasz, 1908

References

 Salvini-Plawen L v. (1978). Antarktische und subantarktische Solenogastres (eine Monographie: 1898-1974). Zoologica (Stuttgart) 128: 1-305.

External links
 Salvini-plawen, L. V. (1997). Systematic revision of the Epimeniidae (Mollusca: Solenogastres). Journal of Molluscan Studies. 63(2): 131-155

Solenogastres